RCD may refer to:

Science and technology
 Residual-current device, a safety device that breaks an electrical circuit
 Rabbit calicivirus disease, a disease caused by the Rabbit haemorrhagic disease virus
 Registered clock driver chips, part of registered memory DIMMs
 Resistor-capacitor delay in electronic circuits

Organisations
  (Rally for Congolese Democracy), a rebel group in the Democratic Republic of the Congo
 The Royal Canadian Dragoons, a Canadian Forces armoured regiment
  (Democratic Constitutional Rally), a political party in Tunisia
 Rally for Culture and Democracy, a political party in Algeria 
 Regional Cooperation for Development, a former multi-governmental organization of Iran, Pakistan and Turkey

Football clubs
 RCD Mallorca ( or Catalan: Reial Club Deportiu)
 RCD Espanyol de Barcelona
 Real Club Deportivo de La Coruña

Other uses
 Rural cluster development, a form of subdivision of residential housing  
 Registered Community design, an industrial design right that covers the European Community
 Recreational Craft Directive, a European Union directive for pleasure boats
 Rochdale railway station, Greater Manchester, England (National Rail station code)

See also